The sack of Aleppo was a major event in 1400 during the war between the Timurid Empire and Mamluk Sultanate.

History
In 1400, Timur's forces invaded Armenia and Georgia, then they took Sivas, Malatya and Aintab. Later on, Timur's forces advanced towards Aleppo with caution, where they tended to construct a fortified camp each night as they approach the city. The Mamluks decided to fight an open battle outside the city walls. After two days of skirmishing, Timur's cavalry moved swiftly in arc shapes to attack the flanks of their enemy lines, while his center including elephants from India held firm. Fierce cavalry attacks forced the Mamluks led by Tamardash, governor of Aleppo, to break and flee towards the city gates. Afterwards, Timur took Aleppo, then he massacred many of the inhabitants, ordering the building of a tower of 20,000 skulls outside the city.

During Timur's invasion of Syria in the Siege of Aleppo, Ibn Taghribirdi wrote that Timur's Tatar soldiers committed mass rape on the native women of Aleppo, massacring their children and forcing the brothers and fathers of the women to watch the gang rapes which took place in the mosques. Ibn Taghribirdi said the Tatars killed all children while tying the women with ropes in Aleppo's Great mosque after the children and women tried to take refuge in the mosque. Tatar soldiers openly raped gentlewomen and virgins in public in both the small mosques and the Great Mosque. The brothers and fathers of the women were being tortured while forced to watch their female relatives get raped. The corpses in the streets and mosques resulted in stink permeating Aleppo. The women were kept naked while being gang raped repeatedly by different men. Ibn Arabshah witnessed the slaughters and rapes Timur's Tatar soldiers carried out.

Aftermath
After the sack of Aleppo, Timur's forces went south where they took Hama, along with nearby Homs and Baalbek, until they reached Damascus which was also sacked after defeating Mamluk forces led by Nasir-ad-Din Faraj. Damascus had capitulated without a battle to Timur in December 1400 since the Mamluk Sultan who led his army form Egypt only fought minor skirmishes before fleeing back to Cairo with the Sultan claiming he needed to stop a rival from taking power.

Notes

References

Bibliography 
 

Aleppo
Aleppo
Aleppo
1400 in Asia
Aleppo
1400s in the Middle East